Esquel Airport is an international airport in Chubut Province, Argentina serving the city of Esquel.

It was built in 1944, and was officially inaugurated on April 17, 1945. The new terminal was constructed in 1978.  The only runway was paved in 1973, and re-paved in 1999 because it was badly damaged.

It has a 1,050m² passenger terminal, 96,500m² of runways,  and a 1,050m² hangar.

Since 1998, it has been operated by Aeropuertos Argentina 2000. In 2010, 21,561 passengers flew through Esquel Airport.

The airport closed temporarily in May 2008 because of volcanic activities in El Chaitén, Chile.

Airlines and destinations

Statistics

External links
, Organismo Regulador del Sistema Nacional de Aeropuertos
, Aeropuertos Argentina 2000

References

Airports in Argentina
Airports established in 1944
1944 establishments in Argentina